Undressing Extraordinary (AKA: The Troubles of a Tired Traveller) is a 1901 British short  silent comedy film, directed by Walter R. Booth, featuring a tired traveller struggling to undress for bed. The film, "provides one of the earliest filmed examples of something that would become a staple of both visual comedy and Surrealist art: that of inanimate objects refusing to obey natural physical laws, usually to the detriment of the person encountering them," and according to Michael Brooke of BFI Screenonline, "has also been cited  as a pioneering horror film," as, "the inability to complete an apparently simple task for reasons beyond one's control is one of the basic ingredients of a nightmare."

References

External links

1901 films
British black-and-white films
British silent short films
1901 comedy films
1901 short films
Articles containing video clips
British comedy short films
Films directed by Walter R. Booth
Silent comedy films